Gastrotheca litonedis is a species of frog in the family Hemiphractidae.
It is endemic to Ecuador.
Its natural habitats are subtropical or tropical high-altitude shrubland, subtropical or tropical high-altitude grassland, rivers, and intermittent freshwater marshes.
It is threatened by habitat loss.

References

Gastrotheca
Amphibians of Ecuador
Amphibians of the Andes
Taxonomy articles created by Polbot
Amphibians described in 1987